Magic Magic may refer to:

Magic Magic 3D, 2003 Indian 3D film
Magic Magic (2013 film), Chilean-American film by Sebastián Silva